Sven Martinek (born 18 February 1964) is a German actor, best known for portraying the main character Max Zander on the German TV series Der Clown.

He was married to German actress Xenia Seeberg from 2003 to 2011. They have one son, Philip-Elias, who was born in 2005.

Filmography

Film

Television

External links
 

1964 births
Living people
German male film actors
German male television actors
20th-century German male actors
21st-century German male actors
Actors from Magdeburg
Ernst Busch Academy of Dramatic Arts alumni